Cladochaeta is a genus of flowering plants in the family Asteraceae.

Cladochaeta grows in an upwards habit with erect, branching, herbaceous stems, usually oblong elliptical leaves, and small, yellow flowers on an inflorescence.

There is only one known species, Cladochaeta candidissima, native to the Caucasus (Azerbaijan, Georgia, Dagestan).

References

Gnaphalieae
Flora of the Caucasus